Ajay Kumar is an Indian politician from Bihar. He represents Communist Party of India (Marxist).

He got elected from Bibhutipur Vidhan Sabha Constituency in 2020 Bihar State Assembly Elections. He is well known for his Social Work and kind hearted behaviour. In Ujiarpur he is well known Politician as he contested from there too before contesting from Bibhutipur. He has good relations with few of his party’s prominent leaders like R Mahto, Manoj Gupta, S P Sinha and many more. Beyond his political life he is a good human being and well known as helping hands of poor and deprived ones. And he is also known for his honesty.

About family members:-

His father's name is Yogendar Singh. He is ex MLA of Khagaria. His wife's name is Basanti Kumari. She is a government teacher. And he has a son named Gaurav Kumar who is an engineer.

Life 
He is the son of Yogendra Singh. He completed Post Graduate in 1993 from Samastipur College. In 1996 he completed LL.B from BS College Sultanganj. And his son's name is Gaurav Kumar.

Political career

2019 Lok Sabha election 
Ajay Kumar was the CPI(M) candidate in Ujiarpur for 2019 Lok Sabha Election.

2020 Bihar State Assembly elections 
Ajay Kumar won the Bibhutipur Vidhan Sabha Constituency, in Mithila region and Samastipur district of Bihar.

References 

Members of the Bihar Legislative Assembly
Communist Party of India (Marxist) politicians from Bihar
Living people
Year of birth missing (living people)